Dragnevtsi may refer to the following places in Bulgaria:

Dragnevtsi, Gabrovo Province
Dragnevtsi, Veliko Tarnovo Province